Frank A. Fucarino (July 24, 1920 – April 3, 2012) was an American professional basketball player for the Toronto Huskies. He played in the first ever NBA game.

BAA career statistics

Regular season

References

External links

1920 births
2012 deaths
Basketball players from New York City
American expatriate basketball people in Canada
American men's basketball players
Forwards (basketball)
LIU Brooklyn Blackbirds men's basketball players
Toronto Huskies players
Undrafted National Basketball Association players
Sportspeople from Queens, New York